The Crater Lake newt or Mazama newt, Taricha granulosa mazamae, is a subspecies of the rough-skinned newt. Its type locality is Crater Lake, Oregon. Similar newts have been found in Alaska, but their identity is unclear.

The Crater Lake newt population is under threat due to predation from crayfish and rainbow trout that have been introduced into the lake.

References

Crater Lake
Newts
Amphibians of the United States